Phelotropa is a moth genus of the family Depressariidae.

Species
 Phelotropa conversa Meyrick, 1923
 Phelotropa oenodes Meyrick, 1915

References

Stenomatinae